Ricky Martin is the eponymous debut solo studio album recorded by Puerto Rican-American recording artist Ricky Martin, It was released by Sony Discos and Columbia Records on November 26, 1991 (see 1991 in music).

Commercial performance
Ricky Martin peaked at number five on the Latin Pop Albums in the US and sold over 500,000 copies worldwide. It was certified Gold in Mexico, Chile, Argentina, Colombia and Puerto Rico. The album includes Martin's first solo hits: "Fuego Contra Fuego," "El Amor de Mi Vida" and "Vuelo".

Track listing

© MCMXCI. Sony Music Entertainment (México), S.A. de C.V.

Charts

Weekly charts

Year-end charts

Certifications and sales

See also
 1991 in Latin music
 List of best-selling albums in Brazil

References

1991 debut albums
Ricky Martin albums
Spanish-language albums
Sony Discos albums
Sony Music Mexico albums
Columbia Records albums